Josip Juranović (born 16 August 1995)  is a Croatian professional footballer who plays as a right-back for Bundesliga club Union Berlin and the Croatia national team.

Club career
Born in Zagreb, Croatia, Juranović went through the ranks of the third-tier Dubrava, apart from a two-month stint at the nearby NK Croatia Sesvete academy. Making his third-level senior debut in the 2012–13 season, he first drew attention to himself by winning the Croatian leg of the Nike Chance competition for amateur players in early 2014, earning the right to vie for a spot in the Nike Academy team. Not making the five-person cut, however, he returned to his club. His club performances remained strong, and, touted by some media as the best player of the autumn leg of the 2014–15 Treća HNL Zapad, he drew the attention of HNK Hajduk Split.

After signing a three-and-a-half-year contract with Hajduk Split in early 2015, he initially joined their third-tier B team, but was moved to the first team in April 2015 by the new manager Goran Vučević, and he made his Prva HNL debut in a 2–1 home loss against Rijeka.

In June 2018, Juranović was selected in the Prva HNL team of the season for his performances during the 2017–18 season.

Legia Warsaw
On July 31, 2020, he signed a three-year contract with the Polish club Legia Warszawa. He scored the first goal for Legia on October 21, 2020, in a 2-1 win against Śląsk Wrocław. He won the Ekstraklasa at the end of his only season at the club.

Celtic
Juranović signed for Scottish Premiership side Celtic in August 2021 from Legia Warsaw on a five-year deal. The transfer fee was a reported £2.5 million. Despite playing the majority of his professional career as a right-back, Juranovic would start as a left-back during his introductory stage at Celtic, including his debut against rivals Rangers at Ibrox. He would assume the role of Celtic's penalty taker in his first season, notably scoring against Real Betis, Bayer Leverkusen and three other times in the league. In December, he was a member of Celtic's League Cup victory against Hibernian. His contributions to Celtic's title-winning defence would see him earn a spot in the PFA Scotland Team of the Year.

On 6 September 2022, Juranović played his first UEFA Champions League group stage match in a 3-0 home defeat against Real Madrid at Celtic Park.

While on international duty with the Croatian national team, Juranović was strongly linked to a move away from Celtic during the 2022 FIFA World Cup with Barcelona, Atlético Madrid, Chelsea and being credited with interest ahead of the January transfer window. Speculation heightened after Celtic signed Canadian international Alistair Johnston from Major League Soccer side CF Montréal, who was seen as Juranović's potential replacement at right-back.

Union Berlin
On 22 January 2023, Juranović signed for Bundesliga side Union Berlin for £7.5 million plus additional add-ons.

International career
On 14 January 2017, Juranović made his international debut in the third-place playoff of 2017 China Cup against China, Croatia lost 5-4 on penalties after a goalless draw.

On 17 May 2021, he was selected in Croatia's 26-man squad for the UEFA Euro 2020. He played two games for the team in the tournament, a 3–1 win against Scotland in the group stage and a 5–3 defeat by Spain in the Round of 16.

On 9 November 2022, Juranović was selected in Croatia's 26-man squad for the 2022 FIFA World Cup. They were eliminated in the semi-final against Argentina. They played their last game on 17 December in a 2–1 victory against Morocco; finishing in third-place.

Personal life
Juranović is from the Dubrava area in the capital of Zagreb. He went to Mato Lovrak elementary school in Klaka, Dubrava.

Career statistics

Club

International

Honours
Legia Warsaw
Ekstraklasa: 2020–21

Celtic
Scottish Premiership: 2021–22
Scottish League Cup: 2021–22
Scottish League Cup: 2022–23

Croatia
 FIFA World Cup third place: 2022

Individual
Prva HNL Team of the Season: 2017–18
PFA Scotland Team of the Year (Premiership): 2021–22

References

External links

1995 births
Living people
Footballers from Zagreb
Association football fullbacks
Croatian footballers
Croatia international footballers
UEFA Euro 2020 players
2022 FIFA World Cup players
NK Dubrava players
HNK Hajduk Split players
Legia Warsaw players
Celtic F.C. players
Second Football League (Croatia) players
Croatian Football League players
Ekstraklasa players
Scottish Professional Football League players
Croatian expatriate footballers
Croatian expatriate sportspeople in Poland
Croatian expatriate sportspeople in Scotland
Expatriate footballers in Poland
Expatriate footballers in Scotland